Geoffrey Brindley known locally as The Jesus Man of Bradford was a well known figure in the city of Bradford, West Yorkshire for over 50 years. Brindley would walk the streets of Bradford dressed in a monk's habit and sandals waving hello and smiling to people wherever he went.

Life
Geoffrey Brindley, as the local legend goes gave up his job as a machinist to live in a cave near Settle in order to receive a message from God. He spent 12 days in the cave before setting off to Bradford wearing a habit. After moving to Bradford he would spend his days just walking the streets and became such a popular figure around the city that he regularly stopped at homes where his hosts served him a cooked dinner.

During his early life as a Christian, Mr Brindley is thought to have been arrested for causing a breach of the peace outside a bingo club whilst preaching about gambling and protesting about a Beatles concert.

In 2011, a petition nominating Bradford Jesus Man to carry the Olympic torch amassed over 23,000 signatures.

After his death, £2,000 was raised to build a statue of him in Baildon.

Death
Geoffrey Brindley, died aged 88 following a stroke and subsequent fall down the stairs at his home which had left him hospitalised. The death was not treated as suspicious but with little known about him, a request was put out in the town of Buxton to find any relatives. At his funeral hundreds of people lined the streets near Bradford Cathedral to pay their respects.

References

2015 deaths
People from Bradford